Vračevce is a small village in the municipality of Staro Nagoričane, North Macedonia.

Geography
To the nearest city, the settlement is 17 kilometres northeast of Kumanovo. Vračevce is situated in the historical region of Sredorek, in the Kozjak mountain region (Kozjačija), on ca. 430 m above sea. The Pčinja river flows east of the village.

History
In Serbian Emperor Stefan Dušan's (r. 1331–55) confirmed on 10 August 1354, several villages, settlements and arable land which was granted (metochion) by despot Dejan to his endowment, the Arhiljevica Church of the Holy Mother of God. Vrače was one of the mentioned selište (arable land). In the 1379 charter of Dejan's son Konstantin, it was not mentioned. The Kumanovo region (old Žegligovo) received its geographical location and certain settlement picture in the 14th century, during the rule of the Nemanjić and Dejanović.

Demographics
According to the 2002 census, it had 22 inhabitants, all of whom declared as ethnic Macedonians. The families are Eastern Orthodox Christian. In the 1994 census, it had 25 inhabitants.

Notable people
Stanko Mladenovski (b. 1937), Yugoslav politician

References

Sources

External links

Villages in Staro Nagoričane Municipality